Terrence Deon Long (born February 29, 1976) is an American former professional baseball outfielder. He played in Major League Baseball (MLB) from 1999 to 2006 for the New York Mets, Oakland Athletics, San Diego Padres, Kansas City Royals, and New York Yankees.

Career
The New York Mets drafted Long in the first round (20th pick) of the 1994 amateur draft. On July 23, 1999, the Mets traded him and minor leaguer Leo Vasquez to the Oakland Athletics for Kenny Rogers. The 2000 season was a stellar season for Long. He finished the season by hitting .288 with 18 home runs and 80 RBI's and finished 2nd in Rookie of the Year award voting. On November 26, 2003, the Athletics traded him and Ramón Hernández to the San Diego Padres for Mark Kotsay.  On November 8, 2004, the Padres traded Long, Dennis Tankersley, and cash to the Kansas City Royals for Ryan Bukvich and Darrell May. In 2006, Long signed a minor league contract with the New York Yankees, who later called him to the major league level on May 21, 2006, to replace an injured Hideki Matsui. On July 7, Long was designated for assignment by the Yankees and released.

References

External links
, or Retrosheet
Venezuelan Winter League

1979 births
Living people
African-American baseball players
American expatriate baseball players in Canada
Baseball players from Montgomery, Alabama
Binghamton Mets players
Capital City Bombers players
Columbus Clippers players
Kansas City Royals players
Kingsport Mets players
Louisville Bats players
Major League Baseball center fielders
Navegantes del Magallanes players
American expatriate baseball players in Venezuela
New York Mets players
New York Yankees players
Norfolk Tides players
Oakland Athletics players
People from Millbrook, Alabama
Pittsfield Mets players
Sacramento River Cats players
San Diego Padres players
St. Lucie Mets players
Vancouver Canadians players
21st-century African-American sportspeople
20th-century African-American sportspeople